Arianna Stephany Burgos Carrera is an Ecuadorian lawyer and politician and member of Ecuador's National Assembly.

Life 
Burgos Carrera became a lawyer and she served on the Samborondón Chamber of Commerce and she was their vice President for 2019-2020. She is involved with training entrepreneurs as part of the "Emprendindo Juntas" project. She was the director of that project which is part of the Emprende Más Organization.

She stood as a candidate to become a member of Ecuador's National Assembly as a member of the Creo 21 party in October 2020. She stood in the Guayas Province.

She was second on the list of candidates that was led by Guido Chiriboga. There were 20 places for representatives for Guatas that were settled in the February 2021 elections. They were both elected.

Burgos became the Vice Minister of Economic Inclusion. In this capacity she toured the community of Cruz Loma where measures have been taken against child malnutrician including Child Development Centers where fresh crops were being grown.

References 

Living people
Year of birth missing (living people)
21st-century Ecuadorian women politicians
21st-century Ecuadorian politicians
Members of the National Assembly (Ecuador)